Yugoslav Army Outside the Homeland is the term for members of the Royal Yugoslav Army who managed to escape capture in the April War. This part of the Yugoslav Аrmy numbered about 980 to 1158 people, mostly members of the navy and air force, who were stationed in Egypt and the Middle East. Only this part of the army was under the direct command of the Yugoslav government-in-exile.

World War II

Forming 

A group of high-ranking officers led by the Prime Minister and Army General Dušan Simović, the Minister of the Army and Navy Bogoljub Ilić and the Commander of the Air Force, Brigadier General Borivoje Mirković together with members of the government and King Peter II left the Kingdom of Yugoslavia on 15 April 1941 from Nikšić via Greece for Palestine and Egypt. The break-up and collapse of the Yugoslav Army in April 1941, disorganization and devastation forced the airmen to cope on their own in difficult circumstances. Several planes flew over the territory of the Soviet Union. A number of airmen left the mainland from Macedonia to Greece and further by ships to the Middle East. On 17 April, seaplanes flew eight flights from the Bay of Kotor to Greece. They flew to Alexandria via Corfu, Athens and Crete on 23 April 1941. Individuals and smaller groups of the land army withdrew from Macedonia on their own initiative. The gathering was held in the territories of Egypt and Jordan. From that day on, the evacuated army that escaped capture during the capitulation was named the Yugoslav Army Outside the Homeland.

On 21 July 1941, General Ilić submitted a report to Prime Minister Simović, on the number of members of the exiled army in Cairo. The number of evacuated members by army consisted of the army: 38 officers, 16 non-commissioned officers, 26 corporals and ranks, and from the navy: 15 officers, 1 mechanical officer, 1 civil engineering officer, 1 medical officer, 67 non-commissioned officers, 9 corporals and ranks. There were the most members of the aviation: 103 officers, 100 non-commissioned officers, 37 corporals and ranks.

Development 

During 1941, a Yugoslav air squadron, consisting of 3 squadrons (fighter, bomber and marine squadron), was to be formed from the fleeing airmen with the help of the British. Only marine and fighter squadrons were formed, and the bomber was not. At the request of the British, the hunting squadron was disbanded after about 15 days. Later, an air force command was formed. A marine squadron was formed in Abu Kebir from aviators who fled from the Bay of Kotor in April 1941. It joined the British squadron, which defended the wider region of Alexandria, rescued fallen and stray crews and discovered enemy vessels. Of the weapons, it had seaplanes with which it flew from Yugoslavia to Africa. Until April 1942, the squadron carried out combat missions.

At the end of April 1942, the hydro squadron ceased combat operations due to the dilapidation of the seaplanes with which they flew in from Yugoslavia, and the new allies did not assign them. The Supreme Command of the Royal Army had a Guards Battalion, composed of prisoners from Istria and the Slovenian Littoral, an air force and a naval detachment. The entire Yugoslav Army Outside the Homeland numbered 980 people.

Problems and disbandment 
Mass cancellation of obedience to the elders and defections to the Overseas Brigades of the National Liberation Army were daily occurrences after 1 January 1944. The disobedient were disarmed and on 15 April 1944, about 1158 officers, non-commissioned officers and fighters gathered, ready to join the Yugoslav Partisans. A considerable number of royal airmen did not immediately declare themselves for the National Liberation War. Some waited for the situation to clear up, so individuals and smaller groups declared themselves by the end of 1944, and some even in 1945. A number of officers and soldiers did not want to join the Partisans. They remained abroad, and some of them actively worked against the Democratic Federal Yugoslavia after the war.

Notable Units
Royal Yugoslav Guards Battalion (1941–1944)
No. 7 (Yugoslav) Troop of the 10th (Inter-Allied) Commando (1943–1944)
Royal Yugoslav Air Force Detachment (1943–1945)
B Flight, No. 94 Sqn South African Air Force (1943–1944)

See also
Greek Armed Forces in the Middle East
Anders' Army

References

Bibliography

Further reading
 

Kingdom of Yugoslavia
Yugoslavia in World War II
Royal Yugoslav Army
Armies in exile during World War II
Military units and formations established in 1941
Egypt in World War II